The Ateneo de Manila University (Filipino: Pamantasang Ateneo de Manila; Spanish: Universidad Ateneo de Manila), also known simply as the Ateneo de Manila, the Ateneo, or AdMU, is a private, research, basic and higher education institution along the historic Katipunan Avenue in Quezon City, Philippines. Founded in 1859 as Escuela Municipal de Manila, the school was founded and is run by the Society of Jesus, and is the second-oldest Jesuit-administered institution of higher learning in Asia-Pacific.

Considered one of the top universities in the Philippines, the university provides primary and secondary education as well as undergraduate and graduate instruction in the humanities, social sciences, natural sciences and engineering, and business. It offers professional degrees through the Graduate School of Business, the School of Government, the School of Medicine and Public Health, and the Ateneo Law School. Known for its Jesuit liberal arts tradition, the humanities are a key feature of Ateneo education at all levels of study. This is especially pronounced in the undergraduate level as the Core Curriculum.

History

On September 25, 1969, Fr. Pacifico Ortiz, SJ was installed as the first Filipino president of the Ateneo de Manila University. At this time, the Graduate School split into the Graduate School of Arts and Sciences and what would become the Graduate School of Business. In 1968, the Ateneo co-founded the Asian Institute of Management. The Ateneo college opened its doors to its first female students in 1973. The Graduate School of Arts and Sciences moved to Loyola Heights in 1976, and the Padre Faura campus closed in 1977 as the Graduate School of Business and the Law School moved to Salcedo Village, Makati. In February 1978, Ateneo opened what would become the Ateneo Computer Technology Center.

As student activism rose in the 1970s following the proclamation of martial law by President Ferdinand Marcos, Ateneans took an active role along with student organizations from other colleges and universities. On February 11, 1986, alumnus and Antique Governor Evelio Javier was shot and killed. Two weeks later, Ateneans joined thousands of Filipinos in the People Power Revolution along EDSA to oust Marcos.

In 1991, the School of Law became the first law school in the Philippines to confer the Juris Doctor degree. The Ateneo School of Government was established in 1996 and, in 1998, a campus housing the Ateneo Graduate School of Business, Ateneo School of Law, and the Ateneo School of Government, opened in Rockwell Center in Poblacion, Makati. The Science Education Complex was also completed in the Loyola Heights campus. In 2000, the School of Arts and Sciences, consisting of the undergraduate and graduate schools, was restructured into the Loyola Schools. In April 2002, the office of the university president established Pathways to Higher Education-Philippines, one of the university's outreach initiatives, with the help of the Ford and Synergeia Foundations. In July 2002, the Church of the Gesù was completed in the Loyola Heights campus. In 2003, the Ateneo entered into its partnership with Gawad Kalinga, its first formal, university-wide social action program.

In July 2006, the Manuel V. Pangilinan Center for Student Leadership was completed. The Ateneo School of Medicine and Public Health facility in Ortigas Center, Pasig welcomed its first batch of professional students in June 2007. In 2008, work on a new Rizal Library facility began and a new set of university dormitories was inaugurated.

2022 shooting incident 

On July 24, 2022, a former mayor of Lamitan, Basilan, and two others were killed. As a result, the scheduled graduation ceremonies of the university's law school was cancelled.

Schools
The university is organized into twelve schools, grouped into three units: The Loyola Schools, the Professional Schools, and the basic education unit.

Loyola Schools
The Loyola Schools are the higher education units of the Ateneo de Manila University that offers undergraduate and graduate degree programs in the arts and sciences and operates under the Vice President of the university. It is located at the university's Loyola Heights campus in Katipunan, Quezon City. It confers the Bachelor of Arts, Bachelor of Science, Bachelor of Fine Arts, Master of Arts, Master of Science, and Doctor of Philosophy degrees. It offers its Honors Programs only to the top 10-15% of university applicants and has a higher cut-off grade than the minimum graduation grade requirement in order to remain in the program.

The Loyola Schools are currently composed of five schools: the School of Humanities (SOH), the John Gokongwei School of Management (JGSOM), the School of Science and Engineering (SOSE), and the School of Social Sciences (SOSS), and the Gokongwei Brothers School of Education and Learning Design(GBSEALD), which was established in 2021. The arrangement of the Loyola Schools academic buildings reflects its origin as a single College of Arts and Sciences.

Professional Schools
The Ateneo Professional Schools are the professional education units of the Ateneo de Manila University, and consists of four schools. The Graduate School of Business, which confers the Master of Business Administration (MBA) and Master in Entrepreneurship degrees, and the School of Law, which confers the Juris Doctor (JD) and Master of Laws (LL.M.) degrees, are both located in the Rockwell Center campus in Makati. The School of Medicine and Public Health, which offers an integrated Doctor of Medicine (M.D.) - MBA program, is located in the Ortigas campus in Pasig. The School of Government, which confers the Master in Public Management and Ph.D. in Leadership Studies degrees, is located in the Loyola Heights campus in Quezon City.

Basic education

Grade school

The Ateneo de Manila Grade School (AGS) is the elementary education unit of the Ateneo de Manila University, and is the oldest unit in existence - Ateneo de Manila began as a government-run primary school during the Spanish colonial period. It is an all-boys school with a population of around 4,000 students. The school had implemented the K-12 program since the 2013–14 academic year. The Ateneo de Manila Grade School is one of the first elementary schools in the Philippines to adopt the Singapore math curriculum.

Junior high school
The Ateneo de Manila Junior High School (AJHS) is the middle school unit of the Ateneo de Manila University, offering the seventh to tenth grades for male students. It was established in 2013 to comply with the Philippines' K-12 education system. It currently occupies the old Ateneo de Manila High School campus.

Senior high school
The Ateneo de Manila Senior High School (ASHS) is the senior high school unit of the Ateneo de Manila University, offering the eleventh and twelfth grades since 2013 following the restructuring of the university's high school units in adherence with the national K-12 program. Since the 2016–17 academic year, the ASHS has accepted female students.

The ASHS offers all four academic strands of the K-12 program (Accountancy and Business Management; Humanities and Social Sciences; Science and Technology, Engineering, and Mathematics; and the General Academic). The ASHS currently occupies the new senior high school building topped off in 2016.

Loyola School of Theology
The Loyola School of Theology is a Jesuit school of theology and pastoral studies, run separately from but federated with the Ateneo de Manila University. It is located in the portion of the university's Loyola Heights campus that is geographically within Marikina. The school offers baccalaureate, licentiate, and doctoral ecclesiastical degrees in theology, as well as postgraduate degrees in theological studies, theology, and pastoral ministry from the Ateneo de Manila. It also supports the theology and religious education postgraduate programs of the Ateneo Loyola Schools' Department of Theology.

Campuses
Currently, the main Ateneo de Manila campus is located along Katipunan Avenue in Loyola Heights, Quezon City, Metro Manila. The campus houses the Loyola Schools and the university's grade school and high schools, as well as the Loyola School of Theology. Two other campuses, in Rockwell Center and Salcedo Village, both in Makati, house the university's professional schools of business, law, and government. A fourth facility in the Don Eugenio López Sr. Medical Complex in Ortigas Center, Pasig, houses its professional school of medicine and public health.

Loyola Heights

The  main campus is located in Loyola Heights, along the eastern side of Katipunan Avenue, and is south of and adjacent to the campus of Miriam College. The Grade School, High School, and Loyola Schools are located in the Ateneo's Loyola Heights campus. Beside the Grade School is the Henry Lee Irwin Theater, built in 1995 to house the school's formal events and productions. Complementing the old buildings of the Loyola Schools are the Science Education Complex, as well as the PLDT Convergent Technologies Center and the John Gokongwei School of Management Complex. In 2018, the university inaugurated the Areté, the Ateneo's "creative hub" for visual, practical, and performing arts. The Areté houses the Ateneo Art Gallery, the Hyundai Hall (a 900-seat theater), the Doreen Gamboa Fernandez Black Box Theater, the Unionbank Ubuntu Space, and spaces for the Ateneo's collaborative degree program with Le Cordon Bleu. The Department of Fine Arts and the Ateneo Institute for the Science and Art of Learning and Teaching also hold office in the Areté.

Within the campus is the Rizal Library, the main university library. Also located here are numerous units and research centers affiliated with the Ateneo, such as the Institute of Social Order, Institute of Philippine Culture, Institute on Church and Social Issues, Asian Public Intellectuals Fellowships, the Jesuit Communications Foundation, the Jesuit Basic Education Commission, and others. Also situated here are the East Asian Pastoral Institute, Loyola School of Theology, and the San Jose Seminary, all Jesuit formation institutions federated with the Ateneo de Manila University. The Loyola Heights campus also hosts three scientific research institutions: the Philippine Institute of Pure and Applied Chemistry, the National Chemistry Instrumentation Center, and the Manila Observatory.

Its athletic facilities include the Blue Eagle Gym, also known as the Loyola Center, standing at the southern end of the campus, and the Moro Lorenzo Sports Center (MLSC) on the northern end. The Blue Eagle Gym is one of the largest gymnasiums among the universities in Metro Manila while the MLSC is often used by the Philippines men's national basketball team as well as other professional teams for their training needs.

The Church of the Gesù, completed in July 2002, stands on top of the Sacred Heart Hill and overlooks the rest of the campus. The school's chapels include the St. Stanislaus Kostka Chapel and the Chapel of the First Companions in the high school, the Chapel of the Immaculate Conception in the college complex's Gonzaga Hall, the chapel at the Loyola House of Studies, and the Chapel of the Holy Guardian Angels in the grade school, among others. Two parish churches outside the campus, the Our Lady of Pentecost Parish in Varsity Hills and the Santa María della Strada Parish in Diliman, are within walking distance from the campus.

The Ateneo de Manila is also home to the largest Jesuit community in the Philippines, most of whom reside at the Jesuit Residence in the Loyola Heights campus. These Jesuits are involved in teaching, administration, and research within the university and its affiliated units.

Rockwell Center

The Rockwell Center campus of the Ateneo de Manila University in Makati houses the School of Law, Graduate School of Business, AGSB-BAP Institute of Banking, and the Ateneo Center for Continuing Education. It includes several research centers, a moot court facility, and the Ateneo Professional Schools Library.

Salcedo Village
The Salcedo Village campus in Makati houses the different facilities of the former Ateneo Information Technology Institute and the Ateneo Center for Continuing Education. This facility formerly housed the Professional Schools prior to the completion of the Rockwell campus in 1998.

Ortigas Center
The Ateneo School of Medicine and Public Health (ASMPH) at the Don Eugenio López Sr. Medical Complex in Ortigas Center, Pasig, opened its doors to its pioneering batch of students in June 2007. Beside the ASMPH is its partner hospital, The Medical City.

Campus sustainability
The Ateneo de Manila University established the Ateneo Institute of Sustainability in 2013 to oversee the research and implementation of the university's sustainable development initiatives. In 2014, the Ateneo launched an electric jeepney shuttle system operated by Meralco within its Loyola Heights campus to replace motorized tricycles as the means of transporting students and personnel around the campus; the Ateneo was the first educational institution in the Philippines to implement an electric jeepney transportation system.

Ateneo Blue Cloud
Amidst the COVID-19 pandemic in 2020, the Ateneo de Manila University launched the Ateneo Blue Cloud (stylized AteneoBlueCloud), an online platform for the university's scholarly community. Branded as the university's "virtual campus", the Ateneo Blue Cloud hosts school curricula materials based around their framework of an "adaptive design for learning", wherein online, blended, and face-to-face educational programs are accessible by registered users.

Academics

Teaching and learning
The Ateneo offers instruction in the primary, secondary, undergraduate, and graduate level. It is a research university that offers 48 undergraduate degrees, 93 graduate degrees, and 11 professional degrees. Dual/joint degree programs are offered within the schools and with other universities as well. Individual schools conduct separate admissions processes; admission into one unit in no way guarantees admission into another unit.

As is common in the Philippines, the primary medium of instruction is English, with a few classes taught in Filipino. Aside from teaching and research, the Ateneo de Manila also engages in social outreach.

Undergraduate core curriculum
A key feature of the Loyola Schools is a liberal arts undergraduate core curriculum, required for all undergraduates. It includes philosophy, English and Filipino literature, theology, history, various branches of social sciences, and a community service component. Undergraduate programs at the Loyola Schools are aimed at fostering student-centred learning. The Ateneo follows the semester hour system common in American universities. Most classes are held below 40 students and student discussion is encouraged.

Recognition and reputation

The Times Higher Education World University Rankings ranked the Ateneo as the top university in the Philippines, placing it in the 351–400 bracket of its 2023 global rankings list. The university also placed in the 101–200 bracket worldwide in the THE Impact Rankings 2022 on the seven criteria of Sustainable Development Goals (SDGs), making it the highest among the Philippine institutions included. The university received an overall score of 83.7 out of 100, placing 48th worldwide in adhering to the clean water and sanitation SDG. 

The QS World University Rankings ranked the Ateneo first among private universities and second among all universities in the Philippines in both its World University Rankings and Asia Rankings in 2023. In the QS Graduate Employability Rankings 2022, the Ateneo is ranked in the 151–160 bracket worldwide, making it the highest ranked Philippine university in terms of employability.  

The Commission on Higher Education has designated the Ateneo with 11 Centers of Excellence and 6 Centers of Development. The 11 Centers of Excellence are in Information Technology, Chemistry, Mathematics, Physics, English Literature, Philosophy, Biology, Psychology, Sociology, Business Administration or Management, and Entrepreneurship. The 6 Centers of Development are in Environmental Science, Communication, Electronic Engineering, History, Philippine Literature, and Political Science.

The Ateneo grade school and high school divisions have both garnered the highest level of accreditation from the Philippine Accrediting Association of Schools, Colleges and Universities and the Federation of Accrediting Agencies of the Philippines, making it one of the top schools in the country for primary and secondary education, as of 2017.

Graduate school rankings 
The Legal Education Board has ranked the Ateneo School of Law as the top law school in the past decade, producing a 7.18% share or 1,794 out of total new lawyers. The school continues to consistently have the highest passing rate for first-time examinees, topping the 2020/2021 and 2022 Bar Examinations. Graduates of the Ateneo Law School have an average grade of 89.2 in the Philippine Bar Examination and the school has produced 23 top notchers in history, the second highest number of bar top notchers.

The Professional Regulation Commission has ranked the Ateneo School of Medicine and Public Health as the best performing medical school in the Philippines in 2019, as the school had a 100% passing rate in the Philippine Physician Licensure Examination out of 133 examinees.

The Ateneo School of Government has been ranked as one of the top public policy schools and is the only Philippine institution listed in the first-ever ranking of public-policy schools in the Asia-Pacific region. The school was ranked 25th by citation impact factor, with a total of 7 citations scoring 1.17 impact factor.

Eduniversal ranked the Ateneo Graduate School of Business as one of the top business schools in the country, ranking 3rd with 3 Palmes of Excellence in 2021.

Research centers and auxiliary units
Some of the Ateneo de Manila's most active research hubs work in the fields of disaster risk reduction, prevention, and management; public education; human migration; and governance. The university houses several research centers, and has many links with industry partners, government agencies, and research networks. Some research centers, called auxiliary units, are established by the university board of trustees, while others are organized by individual schools or departments.

Ateneo Center for Asian Studies
Ateneo Center for Economic Research and Development
Ateneo Center for Educational Development
Ateneo Center for English Language Teaching
Ateneo Center for Organisation Research and Development
Ateneo Center for Psychological and Educational Assessment
Ateneo Center for Social Entrepreneurship
Ateneo Center for Social Policy and Public Affairs
Ateneo Family Business Development Center
Ateneo Innovation Center
Ateneo Institute of Literary Arts and Practices
Ateneo Java Wireless Competency Center
Ateneo Language Learning Center
Ateneo Macroeconomic Research Unit
Ateneo-PLDT Advanced Network Testbed
Ateneo Research Network for Development
Ateneo Teacher Center
Ateneo de Manila University Press
Ateneo Wellness Center
Center for Communication Research and Technology
Center for Community Services
Eugenio Lopez Jr. Center for Multimedia Communication
Gaston Z. Ortigas Peace Institute
Governor José B. Fernandez Ethics Center for Business and Public Service
Institute of Philippine Culture
Institute of Social Order
Institute for Church and Social Issues
John Gokongwei School of Management Business Accelerator
John Gokongwei School of Management Business Resource Center
Konrad Adenauer Asian Center for Journalism
Manila Observatory
National Chemistry Instrumentation Center
Ninoy and Cory Aquino Center for Leadership
Pathways to Higher Education-Philippines
Philippines-Australia Studies Network
Philippine Institute of Pure and Applied Chemistry
Ricardo Leong Center for Chinese Studies

Social initiatives
The Ateneo has grounded its vision and mission in the Jesuit educational tradition of engaging with the world at large, leading the university to be involved in civic activities. Social engagement is a key part of Ateneo education, integrated into the curricula of practically all university programs. Social entrepreneurship is also integrated into many of its academic programs.

The Ateneo's social projects include the Ateneo-Mangyan Project for Understanding and Development to help the Mangyan indigenous group from Mindoro, the Bigay Puso and the Christian Service and Involvement Program for grade school students, and the Damay Immersion and Tulong Dunong program for senior high school students. In college, social development is fostered by programs of the Office of Social Concern and Involvement, including house-builds with the poverty alleviation movement Gawad Kalinga and the Ateneo Labor Trials Program tied into junior philosophy classes. Student organizations and offices of the Loyola Schools also operate their own social involvement programs. At the Ateneo Professional Schools, programs and units like the Graduate School of Business' Mulat-Diwa, the Leaders for Health Program, and the Law School's Human Rights Center and Legal Aid programs aim to form leaders. Other Ateneo initiatives include Pathways to Higher Education to help the underprivileged youth and the Ateneo Center for Educational Development which conducts national teacher and principal training programs.

The centerpiece social program of the university is its university-wide social action program in partnership with Gawad Kalinga which has helped build communities and schools in Payatas, Quezon City, in many Nueva Ecija municipalities, and three villages in the Bicol Region. The Ateneo–Gawad Kalinga partnership has also driven Kalinga Luzon, a rehabilitation effort for the victims of Typhoon Nanmadol (Yoyong); GK Youth–Ateneo, one of the largest and most active student social program of the Ateneo; Kalinga Leyte, an ongoing program which aims to provide long-term rehabilitation for the victims of the Southern Leyte landslide and Typhoon Haiyan (Yolanda), and ongoing reconstruction efforts for typhoon-stricken Bicol.

The Ugat Foundation, an apostolate for grassroots families, is also located at the Ateneo.

International collaboration
The Ateneo has international linkages with several universities, institutions, and organizations, particularly in Asia, Australasia, North and South America, and Europe. Through these cooperative efforts, the university hosts visiting faculty and research fellows from institutions abroad, and in turn, Ateneo faculty members also engage in teaching, research, and study in institutions abroad. International cooperation also includes active student exchange through Philippine immersion programs.

Since 2008, the Global Leadership Program was started for students from three other Catholic Jesuit universities in East Asia aside from the Ateneo: Fu Jen Catholic University in Taiwan, Sogang University in South Korea, and Sophia University in Japan.

The Ateneo has partnered with several international institutions in offering certain degree programs. In 2006, the Ateneo partnered with the Sun Yat-sen University in Guangzhou to establish a Confucius Institute. The institute has since offered Mandarin Chinese courses, a Masters in Teaching Chinese as a Foreign Language program, and a scholarship grant for students to study in Chinese colleges and universities. In 2018, the Ateneo Department of Information Systems and Computer Science has partnered with the Queen Mary University of London to offer a double master's degree. In 2019, the School of Management ventured with French culinary school Le Cordon Bleu to establish the Le Cordon Bleu Ateneo de Manila Institute at the Areté. The institute offers a bachelor's degree through the Loyola Schools as well as professional degrees at the Center for Continuing Education at the Graduate School of Business. Other universities that the Ateneo has partnered with to offer joint master's degree programs are the École supérieure des sciences commerciales d'Angers in France, Kyushu University in Japan, Regis University in Denver, and the University of Sydney in Australia.

The Ateneo has also collaborated with the Nippon Foundation and the University for Peace (UPEACE) in Costa Rica to initiate the Asian Peacebuilders Scholarship program. Under the program, students train to become peacebuilding practitioners for a total of eight months at the Ateneo and nine months at UPEACE, eventually receiving a master's degree in Transdisciplinary and Social Development from the Ateneo Department of Political Science and a Master of Arts degree from UPEACE.

Libraries and museum
 
The Ateneo de Manila University has several libraries. The university's largest library is the Rizal Library, part of the Loyola Schools, located in the Loyola Heights campus. The Ateneo Professional Schools Library is housed in the Professional Schools building at the Rockwell campus. The basic education units (Ateneo Grade School, Junior High School, and Senior High School) each have their own libraries; the East Asian Pastoral Institute and the Loyola School of Theology, both located inside the Loyola Heights campus, also have their own.

The Rizal Library is divided into the Old Rizal Library and the New Rizal Library. The Old Rizal Library, which is known as the Special Collections Building, houses rare Filipiniana items including a permanent exhibit of José Rizal memorabilia, a collection of Trinidad Pardo de Tavera, the American Historical Collection containing materials related to the American colonial period, the Ateneo Library of Women's Writings, and other special collections and manuscripts by Filipino scholars, writers, and artists. The New Rizal Library, a five-storey building which opened in November 2009, houses the library's circulation section, the undergraduate and graduate reserve sections, the multimedia collection, the periodicals collection, the Japanese collection, online database access terminals, an information commons, and the Library's technical services facilities.

The Professional Schools Library holds one of the largest collections of materials in the fields of law, business, and government in the Philippines.

Ateneo Art Gallery

The Ateneo Art Gallery is housed in the Arts Wing of the Areté. The gallery is the first and only museum of modern art in the Philippines. The centerpiece of its collection is a selection of post-war art donated to the university by Spanish Filipino businessman Fernando Zóbel de Ayala.

University Archives
The University Archives are housed in the Rizal Library annex building. Since 1958, it has served as the central repository of non-current records of the administrative offices, academic departments, and student organizations. Among its collections are papers and documents from key university people, relics and personal effects of alumni, some archived publications, theses, and dissertations, as well as other materials such as maps, photographs, and art work.

Administration

The Ateneo de Manila University is governed by a board of trustees currently chaired by Bernadine T. Siy. A central administration, led by President of the Ateneo de Manila University Roberto Yap, oversees key initiatives related to academics, international programs, university development and alumni relations, personnel, security, and other university-wide concerns. Yap succeeded Jose Ramon Villarin, on August 1, 2020.

For purposes of administration, the Ateneo's schools are grouped into three units: Basic education (grade school, junior high school, and senior high school), Loyola Schools, and Professional Schools. Each unit is led by a vice president. Each basic education school is led by a principal (JHS and SHS) and a headmaster (grade school); meanwhile, the individual schools under the Loyola Schools and the Professional Schools are led by deans, who in turn oversee department chairs and program directors.

There are also designated vice presidents for Social Development (overseeing social initiatives); University and Global Relations (overseeing internationalization and institutional linkages); Finance (who also acts as the University Treasurer); and Administration & Human Resources.

The Ateneo de Manila has been granted autonomous status by the Philippine Commission on Higher Education (CHED) since 2001, granting it relative leeway in introducing new programs. It is one of few universities in the country to be granted this status, which recognizes a number of the university's programs and departments as Centers of Excellence, indicating the highest degree of instruction, research, and extension in the Philippines of their particular fields or courses, and Centers of Development, indicating "significant improvement" of instruction, research, and extension from the previous year. In 2005, the academic programs of the Loyola Schools were granted a Level IV accreditation—the highest possible level—from the CHED through the Federation of Accrediting Agencies of the Philippines (FAAP) and the Philippine Accrediting Association of Schools, Colleges and Universities (PAASCU). In 2011, it was also granted an Institutional Accreditation by the same body, the first time that both citations were awarded to a university simultaneously.

Student life

Housing

Student organizations

There are currently over 50 accredited college student organizations in the Loyola Schools and 19 accredited student organizations in the Ateneo Law School.

The Ateneo Debate Society, the undergraduate debate organization of the Ateneo, is the highest-ranking debate team in the Philippines and all of Asia, ranking in the top 15 of the World University Debate Rankings since the mid-2000s, peaking at no. 7 in 2012. In 2023, they won their first World Universities Debating Championship title in Madrid, Spain, marking the first time that a Philippine university has won the world's largest international debating tournament, as well as the second Asian university to do so. The organization has also bagged the most number of championships in the United Asian Debating Championships, including previous Asian debating tournaments, with a total of 12 championships.

The Ateneo College Glee Club (ACGC) is the oldest extant university chorale in the Philippines. The ACGC has participated in numerous international choral and choir competitions including the European Grand Prix for Choral Singing. 

The Ateneo de Manila High School's Dulaang Sibol, which began as the Ateneo High School Dramatics Society in 1955, is the oldest existing theater group in the Philippines.

Notable alumni

See also
 De La Salle University – the Ateneo de Manila University's major college rival
 Ateneo–La Salle rivalry
 List of Jesuit educational institutions in the Philippines
 List of Jesuit sites
 Society of Jesus
 Ignatius of Loyola
 List of colleges and universities in Metro Manila

References

Further reading

External links

 
Catholic universities and colleges in Metro Manila
Research universities in the Philippines
Universities and colleges in Quezon City
Educational institutions established in 1859
Spanish colonial infrastructure in the Philippines
Jesuit universities and colleges in the Philippines
University Athletic Association of the Philippines universities
ASEAN University Network
Association of Christian Universities and Colleges in Asia
1859 establishments in the Philippines